Lee Kiddie is a former professional rugby league footballer who played as a  in the 1990s and 2000s. He played at representative level for Scotland, and at club level for Whitehaven.

Playing career

International honours
Lee Kiddie won a cap for Scotland while at Whitehaven in 2003.

Testimonial match
Lee Kiddie's testimonial match at Whitehaven took place in 2003.

References

External links
 Huddersfield edge to victory
 Rugby League news for July
 Hull KR stretch unbeaten run
 Whitehaven 10-42 Warrington

Whitehaven R.L.F.C. players
Place of birth missing (living people)
Scotland national rugby league team players
Living people
Rugby league halfbacks
1975 births